James Ryan may refer to:

Government 
James Tobias Ryan (1818–1899), New South Wales politician
James Ryan (Canadian politician) (1821–1892), politician in New Brunswick, Canada
James Ryan (Wisconsin politician) (1830–1913), Wisconsin politician
James D. Ryan (1844–1925), Irish-born merchant and politician in Newfoundland
James Wilfrid Ryan (1858–1907), US Representative from Pennsylvania
James Ryan (Australian politician) (1863–1940), New South Wales politician
James Ryan (Irish politician) (1891–1970), Irish politician
James L. Ryan (born 1932), American judge on the Michigan Supreme Court and 6th Circuit Court of Appeals

Religion
James Ryan (bishop) (1848–1923), American bishop
James Hugh Ryan (1886–1948), American archbishop

Sports 
James Ryan (rugby union, born 1887) (1887–1957), New Zealand rugby union footballer
James Ryan (rugby union, born 1983), New Zealand rugby union footballer
James Ryan (rugby union, born 1996), Ireland rugby union footballer
James Ryan (hurler) (born 1987), Irish hurler
James Ryan (cricketer) (1892–1915), English cricketer
James E. Ryan (horse trainer) (1900–1976), American horse trainer

Entertainment
James Ryan (actor) (born 1952), South African actor
James Leo Ryan (actor), American actor
James Francis Ryan, character played by Matt Damon in the film Saving Private Ryan

Other
James M. Ryan (1842–1917), businessman from Newfoundland
James Ryan (entrepreneur) (born 1974), American entrepreneur in cyber security
James E. Ryan (educator),  American educator, author, lawyer, and legal scholar
James J. Ryan, Irish Catholic priest and president of St. Patrick's College, Thurles 
James Ryan (born 1961), Canadian union leader of Ontario English Catholic Teachers' Association

See also
Jim Ryan (disambiguation)
Jimmy Ryan (disambiguation)
Jim Ryun (born 1947), American former track athlete and politician